George Frederick Stout  (1860–1944), usually cited as G. F. Stout, was a leading English philosopher and psychologist.

Biography
Born in South Shields on 6 January 1860, Stout studied psychology at the University of Cambridge under James Ward. Like Ward, Stout employed a philosophical approach to psychology and opposed the theory of associationism.

It was as a fellow of St. John's College, Cambridge (1884–1896), that Stout published his first work in 1896: the two-volume Analytic Psychology, whose view of the role of activity in intellectual processes was later verified experimentally by the Swiss psychologist Jean Piaget. The work contains numerous references to Franz Brentano, Kazimierz Twardowski, Carl Stumpf, Christian von Ehrenfels, and Alexius Meinong. The term analytic psychology is a translation of Brentano's term descriptive psychology (cf. also Analytic psychology (Dilthey)).

Stout was appointed to a new lectureship in comparative psychology at the University of Aberdeen in 1896, before becoming reader in mental philosophy at the University of Oxford (1898–1902), where he published his Manual of Psychology in 1899. This work formulated many principles later developed experimentally by the Gestalt school of psychology. Leaving Oxford, from 1903 to 1936, Stout served as professor of logic and metaphysics at St. Andrews, Fife, where he published another major work, Mind and Matter in 1931. He remained at St. Andrews until his retirement thirty years later, in 1936.

Upon his retirement, Stout left for Australia to be with his son. He died in Sydney on 18 August 1944.

Over the course of his career, Stout taught a number of notable students, including G. E. Moore and Bertrand Russell at Cambridge University. In addition, from 1891 to 1920, he served as editor of Mind, a leading philosophical journal, and was president of Aristotelian Society from 1899 to 1904. In metaphysics, Stout is well known for his contribution to trope theory, specifically in the form of a 1923 paper for the Aristotelian Society.

Significant publications 
 Analytic Psychology (1896)
 Manual of Psychology (2 volumes, 1898–1899)
 Studies in Philosophy and Psychology (1930)

See also 
 Gifford Lectures

References

Further reading 
  Maria van der Schaar, "From Analytic Psychology to Analytic Philosophy: The Reception of Twardowski's Ideas in Cambridge", Axiomathes 7: 295–324.

External links 

 
 George F. Stout at The Information Philosopher
George Frederick Stout - The Gifford Lectures

1860 births
1944 deaths
English philosophers
English psychologists
People from South Shields
Academics of the University of Cambridge
Academics of the University of Aberdeen
Academics of the University of Oxford
Academics of the University of St Andrews
Presidents of the Aristotelian Society
Fellows of the British Academy